West Bethel is an unincorporated village in the town of Bethel, Oxford County, Maine, United States. West Bethel has an active post office opened January 12, 1837. The post office was originally located in the store on the corner of Flat Rd. West Bethel has its own ZIP code, 04286.

References

Villages in Oxford County, Maine
Villages in Maine